Polk Township is a township in Shelby County, Iowa. There are 248 people and 6.7 people per square mile in Polk Township. The total area is 36.9 square miles.

References

Townships in Shelby County, Iowa
Townships in Iowa